Sinum concavum, common name the concave ear moon snail,  is a species of predatory sea snail, a marine gastropod mollusk in the family Naticidae, the moon snails.

Description
The size of an adult shell varies between 19 mm and 50 mm.

Distribution
This species is present in the Atlantic Ocean off Senegal, Guinea and Angola.

References
Notes

Sources
 Bernard, P.A. (Ed.) (1984). Coquillages du Gabon [Shells of Gabon]. Pierre A. Bernard: Libreville, Gabon. 140, 75 plates pp
 Gofas, S.; Afonso, J.P.; Brandào, M. (Ed.). (S.a.). Conchas e Moluscos de Angola = Coquillages et Mollusques d'Angola. [Shells and molluscs of Angola]. Universidade Agostinho / Elf Aquitaine Angola: Angola. 140 pp
 Torigoe K. & Inaba A. (2011) Revision on the classification of Recent Naticidae. Bulletin of the Nishinomiya Shell Museum 7: 133 + 15 pp., 4 pls.

External links
 

Naticidae
Gastropods described in 1822